is a Japanese superhero and Kaiju film, serving as the film adaptation of the 2016 Ultra Series television series Ultraman Orb. It was released on 11 March 2017, in celebration to the 50th anniversary of Ultra Seven where the titular character himself and his son Ultraman Zero is set to appear. Both Blu-Ray and the DVD were released on 28 July 2017.

Story

One day, a strange object appeared at the SSP's office, which was revealed to be the X Devizer, a transformation device which inhabited by Ultraman X. Having separated from his host, the Xio personnel Daichi Ozora due to an enemy attack, X sought the help of SSP and Gai (who returned from his wandering activities) in search for his human host but this however brings the threat of a new enemy.

The main villain approached herself as the space witch Murnau with the possession of a Dark Ring that empowers her own strength. With a desire to transform whatever pretty thing she fancies into her personal jewelry collection, she had already captured the Ultra Warriors Ginga and Victory and set her sight on Earth as the main target. Worse enough is the return of Jugglus Juggler who continued his scheming ways from behind the scenes again. With the help of Murnau's alien army, X had finally been captured and added to her jewellery collection.

Now Orb must rescue the new generation Ultra Warriors and master the power of bonds as the battle for Earth has begun.

Production
This movie was previously glimpsed following the conclusion of 2016 Ultraman Festival. It was properly announced on November 23, 2016, in a special event in Ario Hashimoto shopping mall in Sagamihara, Japan. Hideo Ishiguro, the actor of Gai Kurenai highlighted that the movie will introduce Daichi, Ultraman X and Murnau as strong involvements to the plot while having a comedic scene on Shibukawa's part.

On December 9, Tsuburaya further revealed that voice actor Kōichi Yamadera and members of Jungle Pocket, a Japanese comedian trio will participate in the movie as voice casts. They as well revealed that Ultraman Zero, Ginga, Victory and X will be reprised by their original voice actors respectively while the movie's ending theme, TWO AS ONE will be performed by Da-ice and sold as part of their album, NEXT PHASE. Kudo and Hanamura of Da-ice became the guest voice actors of the movie as well, becoming their major debut in voice acting. The director also encouraged the voice actors to perform more ad-libs to their respective roles. Also in commemoration to the movie, preorder for Gai's leather jacket in Bandai Fashion was released and the product is set to shipment in March 2017. Early pre-order of said jacket comes with a pair of free movie tickets for parent-child pair. During the day of the film premier, viewers will be given the chance to shake hands with Ultraman Orb in all of his forms. During the premier of Ultraman Orb the Movie, director Kiyotaka Taguchi reveals that he summed up the entire Ultraman Orb series and spin offs into 10 chapters:
The Origin Saga is envisioned to be chapter 1.
The original series is chapter 6.
Ultraman Orb The Movie is chapter 7.
Due to this, he also mentioned that there will be another future project for the series, with chapters 2-5 taking place in-between The Origin Saga and the original series, while chapters 8-10 will be after the premiere movie.

Reception
According to the Japanese theatre website Eiga.com, Ultraman Orb The Movie ranks seventh in the box office during its premier date.

Cast
/: 
: 
: 
: 
/: 
: 
: 
: 
/: 
 shopkeeper: 
: 
: 
: 
: 
: 

Voice actors
: 
: 
: 
: 
: 
: 
: 
: 
Cicada Woman, : 
Alien Ckalutch, :

Theme song
Insert theme

Lyrics & Composition: 
Arrangement: Toshihiko Takamizawa with 
Artists:  with 

Ending theme
"TWO AS ONE"
Lyrics: MOMO"mocha"N.
Composition: KID STORM, MUSOH, BASIM
Arrangement: KID STORM
Artist: Da-ice

References

External links
Ultraman Orb at Tsuburaya Productions 

2017 films
2010s Japanese-language films
Ultra Series films
Shochiku films
Ultra Seven
Films about parallel universes
2010s Japanese films